Simor is a surname. Notable people with the surname include:

Ágnes Simor (born 1979), Hungarian actress and dancer
András Simor (born 1954), Hungarian economist
Erzsi Simor (1913–1977), Hungarian actress
János Simor (1813–1891), Hungarian Catholic cardinal

See also
Simo (surname)